The American Samoa national under-23 football team, also known as American Samoa U23, represents American Samoa at U23 tournaments. The team is considered to be the feeder team for the American Samoa national football team. They are controlled by the FFAS

History
American Samoa U23 made three appearances so far at the OFC U23 Championship. They never reached any further than the Group Stage. So far they also never won a game. They managed to score a total of four goals. Duane Atuelevao is with two goals the top scorer. He scored them in a 3-2 loss against the Cook Islands in 2004.

OFC
The OFC Men's Olympic Qualifying Tournament is a tournament held once every four years to decide the only qualification spot for Oceania Football Confederation (OFC) and representatives at the Olympic Games.

Fixtures & Results

2019

Current squad
The following players were called to the squad for the 2019 OFC Men's Olympic Qualifying Tournament from 21 September - 5 October 2019.

List of coaches
  Rupeni Luvu (2012)
  Stephen Settle (2019)

See also
 American Samoa national football team
 American Samoa national under-20 football team
 American Samoa national under-17 football team
 American Samoa women's national football team

References

External links

Oceanian national under-23 association football teams
Football in American Samoa
Under-23